Erythrophleum fordii is a species of plant in the family Fabaceae. It is found in southeastern China, Taiwan, and Vietnam.
It is a valuable timber tree threatened by overexploitation. It is under second-class national protection in China.

References

fordii
Trees of Taiwan
Trees of China
Trees of Vietnam
Endangered plants
Taxonomy articles created by Polbot
Taxa named by Daniel Oliver